Wawrzyszów may refer to the following places in Poland:
Wawrzyszów, Lower Silesian Voivodeship (south-west Poland)
Wawrzyszów, Masovian Voivodeship (east-central Poland)